Trans-Texas Airways (TTa) and successor Texas International Airlines flew to the following cities in 1949 through 1982.  This information is taken from Trans-Texas Airways and Texas International Airlines timetables referenced below.

Alabama

 Mobile - Mobile Regional Airport (MOB)

Arizona

 Phoenix - Sky Harbor International Airport (PHX)
 Tucson - Tucson International Airport (TUS)

Arkansas
Camden - Harrell Field (CDH)
El Dorado - South Arkansas Regional Airport at Goodwin Field (ELD)
Helena - Thompson-Robbins Airport (HEE)
Hot Springs - Memorial Field Airport (HOT)
Jonesboro - Jonesboro Municipal Airport (JBR)
Little Rock - Little Rock National Airport (LIT)
Magnolia - Magnolia Municipal Airport (AGO)
Pine Bluff - Grider Field (PBF)
Stuttgart - Stuttgart Municipal Airport (SGT)
Texarkana - Texarkana Regional Airport (TXK)
West Helena - served via Helena

California

Los Angeles - Los Angeles International Airport (LAX)
Ontario - Ontario International Airport (ONT)

Colorado

Colorado Springs - Colorado Springs Municipal Airport (COS)
Denver - Stapleton International Airport (DEN)

Connecticut

Hartford - Bradley International Airport (BDL) - This airport also serves Springfield, MA.

Florida

 Fort Lauderdale - Fort Lauderdale–Hollywood International Airport (FLL)
 Pensacola - Pensacola International Airport (PNS)

Louisiana
Alexandria - Esler Regional Airport (ESF)
Baton Rouge - Baton Rouge Metropolitan Airport (BTR)
Fort Polk - served via Beauregard Regional Airport (DRI) in De Ridder, LA
Lafayette - Lafayette Regional Airport (LFT)
Lake Charles  - Lake Charles Regional Airport (LCH)
Monroe  - Monroe Regional Airport (MLU)
Morgan City - served via Harry P. Williams Airport (PTN) in Patterson, LA 
New Orleans - Louis Armstrong International Airport (MSY)
Shreveport - Shreveport Regional Airport (SHV)

Maryland

Baltimore - Baltimore/Washington International Airport (BWI)

Minnesota
Minneapolis/St. Paul - Minneapolis–Saint Paul International Airport (MSP)

Mississippi
Jackson - Jackson-Evers International Airport (JAN)
Natchez - Natchez-Adams County Airport (HEZ)

Missouri

Kansas City - Kansas City International Airport (MCI)
St. Louis - Lambert-St. Louis International Airport (STL)

Nebraska

Omaha - Eppley Airfield (OMA)

Nevada

 Las Vegas - McCarran International Airport (LAS)

New Mexico
Albuquerque - Albuquerque International Sunport (ABQ)
Carlsbad - Cavern City Air Terminal (CNM)
Clovis - Clovis Municipal Airport (CVN)
Hobbs - Lea County Regional Airport (HOB)
Las Cruces -  served via El Paso International Airport (ELP) in El Paso, Texas
Roswell - Roswell International Air Center (ROW)
Santa Fe - Santa Fe Municipal Airport (SAF)

Ohio

Cleveland - Hopkins International Airport (CLE)

Oklahoma

Oklahoma City - Will Rogers Airport (OKC)
Tulsa - Tulsa International Airport (TUL)
Ardmore - Ardmore Airpark (ARD)

Tennessee
Memphis - Memphis International Airport (MEM)

Texas
Abilene - Abilene Regional Airport (ABI)
Alice - Alice Airport (ALI)
Alpine - served via Mafa
Amarillo - Rick Husband Amarillo International Airport (AMA)
Austin - Robert Mueller Airport, now closed (AUS)
Beaumont/Port Arthur - Southeast Texas Regional Airport (BPT)
Beeville - Chase Field
Big Spring - Big Spring McMahon-Wrinkle Airport (BPG)
Brady - Curtis Field (BBD)
Bryan - served via College Station
Brownsville - Brownsville International Airport (BRO)
Brownwood - Brownwood Regional Airport (BWD)
Carrizo Springs - Dimmit County Airport (CZT)
Coleman - Coleman Municipal Airport (COM)
College Station - Easterwood Airfield (CLL)
Corpus Christi - Corpus Christi International Airport (CRP)
Crystal Springs - served via Carrizo Springs
Dallas/Fort Worth – Dallas/Fort Worth International Airport (DFW)  (Hub)
Also previously served were Dallas Love Field (DAL) (Hub) and now closed Greater Southwest International Airport (GSW).  The airline moved its flights from Love Field to Dallas/Ft. Worth Intl. Airport when DFW opened in 1974.  
Del Rio - Val Verde County Airport (DRT)
Eagle Pass - Maverick County Airport (5T9)
El Paso – El Paso International Airport (ELP)
Fort Stockton - Gibbs Field (FST)
Galveston - Scholes International Airport at Galveston (GLS)
Harlingen - Valley International Airport (HRL)
Houston – George Bush Intercontinental Airport (IAH) (Hub) 
 Also previously served was William P. Hobby Airport (HOU) (Hub).  The airline moved its flights from Hobby to Intercontinental when IAH opened in 1969.  Texas International continued to operate a maintenance base at HOU which was subsequently used by Continental Airlines following the merger of the two air carriers.
Kerrville - Kerrville Municipal Airport (ERV)
Laredo - Laredo International Airport (LRD)
Longview - East Texas Regional Airport (GGG)
Lubbock - Lubbock Preston Smith International Airport (LBB)
Lufkin - Angelina County Airport (LFK)
Marfa - Marfa Army Air Field (MRF)
Marshall - Harrison County Airport (Texas) (ASL)
McAllen – McAllen-Miller International Airport (MFE)
McCamey - Upton County Airport (E48)
Midland - Midland International Airport (MAF) - also serves Odessa, TX
Nacogdoches - Del Rentzel Field (currently A.L. Mangham Jr. Regional Airport) (OCH)
Palestine - Palestine Municipal Airport (PSN)
Pecos - Pecos Municipal Airport (PEQ)
San Angelo - San Angelo Regional Airport (SJT)
San Antonio – San Antonio International Airport (SAT)
Temple - Draughon-Miller Central Texas Regional Airport (TPL)
Tyler - Tyler Pounds Regional Airport (TYR)
Uvalde - Garner Field (UVA)
Victoria - Victoria Regional Airport (VCT)
Waco - Waco Regional Airport (ACT)
Wichita Falls - Wichita Falls Municipal Airport (SPS)

Utah
Salt Lake City - Salt Lake City International Airport (SLC)

Virginia

 Washington, D.C. - Reagan National Airport (DCA)

Wisconsin

Milwaukee - General Mitchell International Airport (MKE)

Mexico
Cancun (CUN)
Cozumel (CZM)
Ciudad Juarez - served via El Paso International Airport (ELP) in El Paso, Texas 
Guadalajara (GDL)
Manzanillo (ZLO)
Mérida (MID)
Mexico City - Benito Juarez International Airport (MEX)
Monterrey (MTY)
Puerto Vallarta (PVR)
Tampico (TAM)
Veracruz (VER)
Zihuatanejo - Ixtapa-Zihuatanejo International Airport (ZIH) - route inherited by Continental and as of 2018 United Express

References

The above is taken from the following Trans-Texas Airways and Texas International schedules and route maps:

 November 1, 1949 Trans-Texas timetable (timetableimages.com) 
 January 1, 1952 Trans-Texas timetable (timetableimages.com)
 September 1, 1954 Trans-Texas timetable (timetableimages.com)
 August 1, 1959 Trans-Texas timetable (timetableimages.com)
 March 1, 1963 Trans-Texas timetable (timetableimages.com)
 August 1968 Trans-Texas timetable (timetableimages.com)
 July 1, 1970 Texas International timetable (departedflights.com)
 March 1, 1973 Texas International timetable (timetableimages.com)
 July 15, 1981 Texas International route map (departedflights.com)
 June 1, 1982 Continental/Texas International joint timetable (departedflights.com)

Lists of airline destinations
Texas transportation-related lists